Ondřej Machuča (born 24 April 1996) is a Czech footballer who plays for FK Fotbal Třinec as a midfielder.

Career

Baník Sokolov
On 28 August 2019, Machuča signed with Baník Sokolov.

References

External links
 Ondřej Machuča at Fortuna Liga
 Ondřej Machuča at Eurofotbal
  
 Ondřej Machuča at Futbalnet
 Ondřej Machuča at Slovan Liberec' website

1996 births
Living people
People from Opava District
Czech footballers
Czech expatriate footballers
Association football midfielders
FC Slovan Liberec players
FC ViOn Zlaté Moravce players
1. SC Znojmo players
FC Vysočina Jihlava players
FK Baník Sokolov players
ŠKF Sereď players
FK Fotbal Třinec players
Czech First League players
Slovak Super Liga players
Czech National Football League players
Expatriate footballers in Slovakia
Czech expatriate sportspeople in Slovakia
Sportspeople from the Moravian-Silesian Region